Callichroma iris is a species of beetle in the family Cerambycidae. It was described by Taschenberg in 1870. It is known from Costa Rica, Colombia, and Venezuela. It contains the subspecies Callichroma iris iris and Callichroma iris trilineatum.

References

Callichromatini
Beetles described in 1870